Christopher A. McCullough (born February 5, 1995) is an American professional basketball player for the Formosa Taishin Dreamers of the P. League+. Prior to attending Syracuse University, McCullough went to Salisbury School, Brewster Academy, and IMG Academy.

High school career
McCullough attended Salisbury School for his freshman and sophomore years. During his sophomore season, he led the Salisbury varsity basketball team to its first ever NEPSAC Class A championship. In the championship game, McCullough scored 26 points, while also adding eight rebounds and two blocked shots. At Salisbury, McCullough was coached by Jeff Ruskin. Following his sophomore year at Salisbury, McCullough transferred to Brewster Academy and then, later on, to IMG Academy.

College career
As a freshman at Syracuse in 2014–15, McCullough started in the team's first 16 games of the season before a knee injury suffered against Florida State on January 11 required surgery and ended his campaign. In those 16 games, he averaged 9.3 points, 6.9 rebounds, 1.1 assists, 1.7 steals and 2.1 blocks in 28.1 minutes per game.

Professional career

Brooklyn Nets (2015–2017)
In April 2015, McCullough declared for the 2015 NBA draft, while still recovering from an ACL injury. Despite that, on June 25, he was selected with the 29th overall pick by the Brooklyn Nets. On July 1, he signed his rookie scale contract with the Nets. He missed the first half of the 2015–16 season with the ACL injury he sustained as a freshman at Syracuse. On February 5, 2016, he was activated for the first time, but did not play for the Nets against the Sacramento Kings. Four days later, he made his NBA debut, recording 2 points, 2 rebounds, 1 steal and 1 block in just under 11 minutes off the bench in the Nets' 105–104 win over the Denver Nuggets.

On April 6, 2016, McCullough scored 10 points against the Washington Wizards, reaching double-digits for the first time in his career. He was subsequently elevated to the starting line-up the following game, scoring 12 points on April 8 against the Charlotte Hornets. In his third straight start for the Nets on April 11, he had another 12-point game in a loss to the Wizards.

During his second season with Brooklyn, McCullough had multiple assignments with the Long Island Nets of the NBA Development League.

Washington Wizards (2017–2018)
On February 22, 2017, McCullough was traded, along with Bojan Bogdanović, to the Washington Wizards in exchange for Andrew Nicholson, Marcus Thornton and a 2017 protected first-round draft pick. On March 1, 2017, he made his debut for the Wizards, making just one free throw in 1:39 of action during a win over the Toronto Raptors. Two days later, he was assigned to the Northern Arizona Suns of the NBA Development League, pursuant to the flexible assignment rule. He remained with Northern Arizona until the end of the 2016–17 D-League season.

McCullough signed with the Detroit Pistons to a training camp contract but was waived on October 7, 2018.

Shanxi Brave Dragons (2018–2019)
On October 8, 2018, McCullough signed with Shanxi Brave Dragons of the Chinese Basketball Association. On October 21, 2018, he made his debut for Shanxi, contributed twenty six points and eight rebounds in a win over the Sichuan Blue Whales.

Rio Grande Valley Vipers (2019)
On January 28, 2019, the Rio Grande Valley Vipers welcomed McCullough via Twitter.

Brujos de Guayama (2019)
On May 14, 2019, McCullough joined the Brujos de Guayama of the Baloncesto Superior Nacional in Puerto Rico.

San Miguel Beermen (2019)
On July 2, 2019, McCullough signed with the San Miguel Beermen as a replacement for Charles Rhodes as the team's import for the 2019 PBA Commissioner's Cup. On his PBA debut, McCullough exploded for a professional then-career-high 47 points to go along with 10 rebounds and 6 3-pointers made to lead the Beermen towards the win against the NLEX Road Warriors. On July 10, McCullough recorded 37 points, 13 rebounds and 4 assists in a 128–108 win over the Phoenix Fuel Masters. Two days after, McCullough again led the Beermen towards a win over the Rain or Shine Elasto Painters, 89–87. In that game, McCullough recorded 24 points, 17 rebounds, 4 assists and 5 blocks. Four days after, McCullough recorded 27 points, 16 rebounds and 3 blocks but in a 91–95 loss to the Meralco Bolts, in the last game of the elimination round. On July 31, 2019, McCullough again put on a show for a new career-high 51 points in a loss against Rain or Shine. He ended the series 2 days later with 35 points.

McCullough and the Beermen eventually won the 2019 PBA Commissioner's Cup championship, his first as a professional, in six games of a best-of-seven series. McCullough scored the team high of 35 points, 19 rebounds, and 4 assists against the TNT KaTropa.

Anyang KGC (2019–2020)
In 2019, McCullough signed with the Anyang KGC of the Korean Basketball League.

Rytas Vilnius (2020)
On August 28, 2020, McCullough signed with Rytas Vilnius. On October 3, McCullough was suspended by Rytas Vilnius because he was suspected of escaping from a car accident after the Lithuanian Police found abandoned and damaged Jeep Renegade, which was given to McCullough by the club, in a parking lot and launched an investigation. The Rytas allowed McCullough to return to the team on 12 October as he deeply regretted the incident of violating the club's internal rules and convinced head coach Donaldas Kairys that he is motivated to play. He played his first game after the suspension on 17 October and scored 13 points, while the Rytas achieved a 60–98 victory versus the Neptūnas Klaipėda. On November 10, it was reported that Rytas was parting ways with McCullough.

Al-Ahli (2021)
On June 2, 2021, McCullough was reported to have signed with Al-Ahli of the Bahraini Premier League.

Gigantes de Carolina (2021)
On August 27, 2021, McCullough signed with Gigantes de Carolina of the Baloncesto Superior Nacional.

New Taipei Kings (2022–present)
In January 2022, McCullough joined to the New Taipei Kings of P. League+.

NBA career statistics

Regular season

|-
| style="text-align:left;"| 
| style="text-align:left;"| Brooklyn
| 24 || 4 || 15.1 || .404 || .382 || .478 || 2.8 || .4 || 1.2 || .5 || 4.7
|-
| style="text-align:left;"| 
| style="text-align:left;"| Brooklyn
| 14 || 0 || 5.1 || .516 || .167 || .667 || 1.2 || .1 || .1 || .1 || 2.5
|-
| style="text-align:left;"| 
| style="text-align:left;"| Washington
| 2 || 0 || 4.0 || .000 || .000 || .500 || 1.0 || .0 || .5 || .0 || .5
|-
| style="text-align:left;"|
| style="text-align:left;"| Washington
| 19 || 0 || 4.7 || .429 || .125 || .643 || 1.3 || .2 || .0 || .3 || 2.4
|- class="sortbottom"
| style="text-align:center;" colspan="2"| Career
| 59 || 4 || 9.0 || .426 || .306 || .548 || 1.9 || .3 || .5 || .3 || 3.3

International career statistics

As of the end of the 2019 PBA Commissioners' Cup Finals

|-
| align=center | 2018–19
| align=left | Brujos de Guayama 
| BSN
| 8 || 27.1 || .461 || .250 || .816 || 9.0 || 1.5 || 1.1 || .8 || 16.3
|-
| align=center | 2018–19
| align=left | Shanxi Zhongyu
| CBA
| 3 || 26.2 || .472 || .375 || .833|| 8.0 || 2.0 || .3 || .3 || 15.7
|-
| align=center | 2019
| align=left | San Miguel Beermen
| PBA
| 16 || 43.0 || .466 || .336 || .748 || 15.1 || 3.5 || 1.3 || 2.4 || 32.4
|-
|-class=sortbottom
| align="center" colspan=2 | Career
| All Leagues
| 27 || 36.5 || .465 || .327 || .767 || 12.5 || 2.7 || 1.2 || 1.7 || 25.8

References

External links

Syracuse Orange bio

1995 births
Living people
African-American basketball players
American expatriate basketball people in China
American expatriate basketball people in Lithuania
American expatriate basketball people in the Philippines
American men's basketball players
Basketball players from New York City
BC Rytas players
Brooklyn Nets draft picks
Brooklyn Nets players
Erie BayHawks (2017–2019) players
Long Island Nets players
Northern Arizona Suns players
Philippine Basketball Association imports
Power forwards (basketball)
Rio Grande Valley Vipers players
San Miguel Beermen players
Shanxi Loongs players
Sportspeople from the Bronx
Syracuse Orange men's basketball players
Washington Wizards players
Wisconsin Herd players
21st-century African-American sportspeople
New Taipei Kings players
P. League+ imports